Acasă, My Home is a 2020 German/Romanian/Finnish documentary film directed by Radu Ciorniciuc. The film is about nine children and their parents who lived in harmony with nature in the wilderness of the Bucharest Delta for 20 years until they are chased out and forced to adapt to life in the big city. It was filmed in the course of 4 years, with production starting in 2016. As the movie progresses, it follows the evolution of the family’s life throughout the years of living in the capital. “The 11 family members lived in isolation from society: without documents, without education or access to health care.  Now, all nine children in the Enache family have documents, go to school, are seen regularly by doctors, and adults have stable jobs.”

It had its world premiere at the 2020 Sundance Film Festival on January 27, 2020. It runs for 1 hour 26 minutes. It is in Romanian with English subtitles. It was produced by Autlook films. Zeitgeist Films, Kino Lorber took the North American international distribution rights.

Cast 
 Gica Enache	    ...	Self
 Vali Enache	    ...	Self
 Rica Enache	    ...	Self
 Mihaela Murgoci	...	USB / USR local counselor
 Cristian Zãrescu	...	PSD mayor's counselor
 Prince Charles	...	Self
 Dacian Ciolos	    ...	Prime minister

Critical reception 
The site's critical consensus reads: “Acasa, My Home presents a powerful documentary portrait of one family's odyssey that illustrates bittersweet truths about freedom and society." Won many awards at film festivals, e.g. World Cinema Documentary Special Jury Award at Sundance, Viktor Main Award at the Munchen Dok.Fest, Golden Horn Award at the Krakow Film Festival. It is praised for tackling difficult themes. Producer & Director Monica Lăzurean-Gorgan would also state that “ Home is a film that reflects not only the life of a family, but also a condensed evolution of humanity - from the heart of nature in the middle of civilization, from the wild to an evolved society, with its rules, clichés, pressures and expectations.  “Home” it shows us how we look at each other, through the filters and values ​​set by the way we formed ourselves in society or outside it.  Because "Home" is not a norm, but it has different meanings for each of us. ", with actor Ethan Hawke also expressing his thoughts on the film, “ The experience of watching Radu's film at Sundance was extraordinary. The film is so special, authentic and unique—from the idea and the image to the sincere relationship with the family. It hurt me to see the changes that the protagonists had to go through, the loss of connection with nature. I was very moved and I congratulate Radu for the well-deserved success. "

References

External links 
 
 
 

German documentary films
Romanian documentary films
2020 documentary films
2020 films